Saint Agapitus may refer to:

Agapitus of Palestrina, died c. 274
Pope Agapetus I, died 536
Agapetus of the Kiev Caves, otherwise Agapetus or Agapitus of Pechersk, died 1095